G. Thomas Goodnight is an American argumentation and rhetorical scholar.

Early life and education
Goodnight was born in 1948 in Houston, Texas. He obtained a Bachelor of Science degree in political science from the University of Houston, in 1971 and a Master of Arts, in 1974. He received a Ph.D. from the University of Kansas, in 1977.

Career
Goodnight is a professor and director of doctoral studies in the Annenberg School for Communication at the University of Southern California. He has published essays in Communication Monographs, Communication Theory, Journal of the American Forensic Association, Quarterly Journal of Speech, and Argumentation. He has lectured in France, Belgium, Germany, Italy, Yugoslavia, and the Netherlands.

His seminal contribution to the field of argumentation theory lies in his approach to "spheres of argument," an idea that has sparked many scholarly studies. Before joining USC full-time in 2004, Goodnight taught undergraduate and graduate courses in Northwestern University's Communication Studies department in contemporary rhetorical theory, criticism, theory of argumentation, and the public sphere. His current research interests include deliberation and postwar society, science communication, argument and aesthetics, public discourse studies, and communicative reason in controversy.

Goodnight has been named by the American Forensics Association as one of the top 5 scholars in argumentation in the twentieth century.

References

External links
USC homepage

Living people
University of Southern California faculty
Communication theorists
1948 births